Kosovo–United Kingdom relations are foreign relations between the Republic of Kosovo and the United Kingdom of Great Britain and Northern Ireland. When Kosovo declared its independence from Serbia on 17 February 2008, the United Kingdom became one of the first countries to announce the official recognition of a sovereign Kosovo on 18 February 2008. The United Kingdom has had an embassy in Pristina since 5 March 2008. Kosovo has had an embassy in London since 1 October 2008. The two countries have very good and friendly relations.

Military
The United Kingdom participated in the 1999 NATO bombing of Yugoslavia, which resulted in a UN administration of Kosovo. The United Kingdom currently has 84 troops serving in Kosovo as peacekeepers in the NATO led Kosovo Force. Originally there were 19,000 British troops in KFOR. Mike Jackson was the first KFOR Commander from 12 June 1999 until 8 October 1999.

On 25 April 2008, the British Government announced that it would send a battle-group based on 2 Rifles, a light infantry battalion of about 600 soldiers, to help maintain public order to serve as Peacekeepers in EULEX, an EU Police, Civilian and Law Mission in Kosovo.

Political
The United Kingdom was an important player in the events of 1999. The Kosovo War, which Prime Minister Tony Blair had advocated on moral grounds, was initially a failure when it relied solely on air strikes; he believed that the threat of a ground offensive, which Bill Clinton had initially ruled out, was necessary to convince Serbia's President Slobodan Milošević to withdraw. Blair ordered that 50,000 soldiers - most of the available British Army - should be made ready for action. Blair has visited Kosovo on several occasions since; other British Ministers who have had ministerial responsibility for policy towards Kosovo, such as Dennis MacShane, have also maintained their connections.

Notes

See also
Foreign relations of Kosovo
Foreign relations of the United Kingdom
Serbia–UK relations
United Kingdom–Yugoslavia relations

References

External links
 British Foreign and Commonwealth Office article about relations with Kosovo

 
United Kingdom
Bilateral relations of the United Kingdom